The Next Generation Indie Book Awards, also known as the Indie Book Awards, is a literary awards program that recognizes and honors authors and publishers of exceptional independently published books in 70 different categories. "Indies" include small presses, larger independent publishers, university presses, e-book publishers, and self-published authors. Established in 2007, it is the largest international awards program for indie authors and independent publishers and is presented by the Independent Book Publishing Professionals Group.

History

The not-for-profit  awards program was founded in 2007  by Catherine Goulet and is presented by the Independent Book Publishing Professionals Group in cooperation with co-founder Marilyn Allen of Allen O’Shea Literary Agency. The judges are professionals from the book publishing industry, including literary agents, editors, publishing executives, book reviewers, writing teachers, and authors.

Cash prizes and medals are awarded to winners and finalists ranging from $100 to $1,500, grand prize winners are also awarded a trophy, and the top books in each category are reviewed by literary agents for possible representation. The Next Generation Indie Book Awards are announced each year during BookExpo America in a catalog distributed to BookExpo attendees. Winners and Finalists are honored at a reception during BookExpo America. The awards ceremonies are held at landmark locations in New York City including the Plaza Hotel and the Harvard Club of New York. In 2016 the ceremony was held at the Newberry Library in Chicago.

The Next Generation Indie Book Awards program has been said to be the 'Sundance' of the book publishing world.

Recipients

References

External links 
 

Awards established in 2007
2007 establishments in the United States
American non-fiction literary awards
American fiction awards
English-language literary awards